is a song recorded by Japanese music duo Yoasobi. It was released on January 6, 2021, as the second track and promotional single from their debut extended play (EP), The Book, through Sony Music Entertainment Japan. Later, the song was re-released as a standalone version on July 2, to celebrate 100 million streaming figures and its own cover artwork. The English version of "Encore" was included on the duo's first English-language EP E-Side, was released on November 12.

The song was based on the short story Sekai no Owari to, Sayonara no Uta ("The End of the World, and the Goodbye Song") written by Kanami Minakami and won the Yoasobi Contest Vol. 1. The story is about a man and a woman who meet in a warehouse full of old musical instruments before the world ends. The song also featured in Google Pixel 5, Pixel 4a (5G) advertisement.

Credits and personnel

Credits adapted from The Book liner notes.

Song

 Ayase – producer, songwriter
 Ikura – vocals
 Takayuki Saitō – vocal recording
 Masahiko Fukui – mixing
 Kamina Minakami – based story writer

Music video

 Bun – illustration, animation
 Ocha – assistant
 Kairi – motion graphic, animation

Charts

Weekly charts

Year-end charts

Certifications

Release history

References

External links
 Sekai ni Owari to, Sayonara no Uta on Monogatary.com
 English translation of The End of the World, and the Goodbye Song

2021 songs
Japanese-language songs
Songs used as jingles
Yoasobi songs